The Water Works Standpipe in Dothan, Alabama was listed on the National Register of Historic Places in 2016.

It is a water tower built in 1897, when such were called standpipes.  

The well driller was C.A. Ray, the builder of the standpipe was Guild & White, and the engineer was R. T. Ghent.

References

		
National Register of Historic Places in Houston County, Alabama
Buildings and structures completed in 1897